U.S. Route 66 was a highway established on November 11, 1926, connecting Chicago, Illinois to the Southwest. Several buildings from the Route 66 era still stand and are part of the Historic and Architectural Resources of Route 66 Through Illinois Multiple Property Submission on the National Register of Historic Places.

National Register of Historic Places Multiple Property Submissions in Illinois
U.S. Route 66 in Illinois